The Fiat Abarth OT 1300 is a series of successful Group 4 sports racing cars built by Abarth between 1965 and 1968.

Racing History

Race Victories

1966 Nürburgring 500km 
1967 Hockenheim Grand Prix

Class Victories

1966 Monza 1000km 
1966 Nürburgring 1000km
1966 Mugello Grand Prix 
1966 Coppa Citta di Enna
1966 Hockenheim Grand Prix 
1966 500 km Zeltweg
1967 Mugello Grand Prix
1967 Coppa Citta di Enna
1967 500 km Zeltweg
1967 Ollon-Villars Hillclimb
1967 500 km Nürburgring

References

Abarth vehicles
Fiat vehicles
Cars introduced in 1965
Sports cars
Cars of Italy